Grégory Di Carlo is a Grand Prix motorcycle racer from France.

Career statistics

By season

Races by year

References

External links
 Profile on motogp.com

1993 births
French motorcycle racers
Living people
125cc World Championship riders